Jonathan Ernest Laine (born August 15, 1975) is a Washington DC-based Hip hop producer and drummer.

Background

Jon was born an only child to Haitian parents in Falls Church, Virginia. He has three close cousins. Only recently (in 2009) he connected with his half sister. In 2011 Jon married Allison Gallo Laine and they reside in Northern Virginia.
There are no musicians in his family. Nevertheless, Jon started having an interest in being a musician early on. He taught himself how to play drums listening to his mother's collection of vinyl and watching metal and rap videos on MTV while emulating the drummers he saw. It was not until his senior year of high school that he began classical percussion lessons. During that time he played as the pit percussionist in plays and musicals.
Jon was heavily influenced in marching band and drum corps style drumming.
Some of his first major musical experiences were in the National Symphony Orchestra Summer Youth Ensemble, the Disneyland Collegiate All Star band, of which he beat out drummers from 100 colleges in the nation on the spot, and the Aspen Concert Jazz Ensemble.
Jon holds a Bachelor of Music degree from the George Mason University in Virginia. He then went on to get a Master's of Music degree at Howard University in Washington DC.

Performance

Jon Laine has performed with artists including Aretha Franklin, Stevie Wonder, David Foster, Kenny G, Frédéric Yonnet, Black Milk, El DeBarge, Erykah Badu, Angie Stone, Common, Steve Coleman, Meshell Ndegeocello, Dwele, Louie Bellson, Charlie Byrd, Fred Wesley, Frank Wess, Jimmy Heath, Yusef Lateef and was the drummer for Omar's Sing (if you want it) national tour.
He also performs with local artists including RPM, Justin Jones, Wes Felton, Muhsinah, Panacea, Alison Carney, Kenny Wesley and SITALI.
In 2007 he performed at the Moers jazz festival in Germany and in 2008 at the Sons d'Hiver jazz festival in Paris with Steve Coleman and Opus Akoben.
In addition, Laine was the winner of Downbeat Magazine's Student Music award for Best Instrumental Soloist in 2004 for his performance of Max Roach's The Drum Also Waltzes.

Production

Over the years Jon Laine, formerly known as JLaine, has expanded his work to include music production. He has produced for several local acts including Felton (A Dub Supreme, Postcards from the Edge mixtape, The Last Temptation of Wes Felton),  DJ Roddy Rod (Take N Stride), Aaron Broadus (All This Love) and Antithesis.
Jon Laine made his debut as co-executive producer for veteran singer/songwriter K'Alyn's third LP Verse 1, Chapter 3 alongside his production partner, TFox.
Together Jon Laine and TFox are also known as The Wonderboys.
Jon Laine founded his own production company FastLaineMusic in which he has released solo material under, including 2 J DIlla tribute albums, APPLE JONS and MIV, VA is for Lovers, and his tribute album to Michael Jackson entitled Naturally Human.  His current collaboration project features fellow label mates, TFOX and Wes Felton who go by the name ANTITHESIS. Laine made a song back in 2010 called "Special Lotion", but never released it.

J Dilla Tribute

When J's favorite beat maker and DJ J Dilla passed, he found several ways to coordinate tributes including the J DILLA memorial concert featuring performances by Felton, Raheem DeVaughn, Wayna, Grap Luva, DJ Roddy Rod, Asheru, Cy Young, Phife, Illa J and Dwele. Jon Laine sat as music director for the night which added Dilla's premier group Slum Village as the headliner. To date, Jon Laine has made the Memorial concert an annual event and was hired to direct the performance of the RBMA/XM Dilla Day event at XM studios in Washington DC featuring Pete Rock, Talib Kweli and Maureen Yancey.

Discography

Drumming credits

 1999 Tengo Ongo Sorry for the Eruption
 2002 UrbanMinds MindState
 2003 Aaron Broadus Feels Like The First Time
 2003 Chris McSwain Quijotesco
 2003 HUJE IXXI
 2004 HUJE
 2005 K'Alyn Verse 1, Chapter 3
 2005 Miss Lucy Lion A Lion's Grocery List
 2006 Elisse Perry Share A Moment of Love- (for Hurricane Katrina victims)
 2008 Wayna Higher Ground
 2008 Christos Time To Rise
 2010 Justin Jones & the Driving Rain The Little Fox EP
 2010 Alex Vans Alex Vans
 2010 Kokayi Robots and Dinosaurs
 2011 Oddisee Rock Creek Park
 2011 Nila Kay Serial Love
 2013 PL Dates The Power Broker
 2013 AB Prologue Vo. II
 2014 Diamond District March on Washington
 2015 Hezekiah Dreams Don't Chase Themselves
 2015 Oddisee The Good Fight
 2016 Oddisee Alwasta
 2016 Oddisee The Odd Tape
 2016 Ambassadors Of Morning So Far
 2016 Carolyn Malachi Rise: Story 1
 2018 TFOX SPIDERMENDS
 2020 Nitasha Jackson SQUARE ONE
 2020 Jon Laine Batteries Not Included
 2020 Olivier St Louis Runnin Wild 2020 Oddisee Odd CureProduction CreditsSOLO'''

 2007 Apple Jons Tasteful Licks/FastLaine Music 2009 The SIX EP Tasteful Licks/FastLaine Music 2009 VA is for Lovers Tasteful Licks/FastLaine Music 2009 Naturally Human FastLaine Music 2010 The Underwear Classix Vol. 7 FastLaine Music 2011 MIV FastLaine Music 2011 GIANT FastLaine Music/OTB Management 2014 Number 9 EP FastLaine Music 2019 L A I N E FastLaine Music''

References

External links
 Jon Laine's Website
 Jon Laine's YouTube Channel
 Jon Laine's Instagram
 Jon Laine on Twitter

1975 births
Living people
Musicians from Washington, D.C.
People from Falls Church, Virginia
George Mason University alumni
Howard University alumni